Doddakallahalli can refer to:
Doddakallahalli, Malur, a village in Malur taluk, India
Doddakallahalli, Tumkur district, a village in Kunigal taluk, India